Poenari Castle, also known as Poenari Citadel (Cetatea Poenari in Romanian), is a ruined castle in Romania which was a home of Vlad the Impaler. The citadel is situated high atop a mountain and accessed by climbing 1,480 concrete stairs.

Location
The castle is located on the plateau of Mount Cetatea, facing the west side of the Transfăgărășan, on a canyon formed on the Argeș River valley, close to the Făgăraș Mountains.

History
Poenari Castle was constructed around the beginning of the 13th century by Wallachians. Around the 14th century, Poenari (then known as Castle Arges) was the main citadel of the Basarab rulers. In the next few decades, the name and the residents changed a few times but eventually the castle was abandoned and left in ruins.

However, in the 15th century, realizing the potential for a castle perched high on a steep precipice of rock, Vlad III the Impaler repaired and consolidated the structure by enslaving his enemies from the nobility of the Danubian Principalities of Wallachia and Moldavia, making it one of his main fortresses, rebuilding the former Castle Arges on the left side of the river with stones from the older Castle Poenari, which was on the right bank and somewhat lower. Although the castle was used for many years after Vlad's death in 1476, it eventually was abandoned again in the first half of the 16th century and was in ruins by the 17th century. The size and location of the castle made it difficult to conquer. On January 13, 1913, a landslide caused by an earthquake brought down parts of the castle which crashed into the river far below. After two further earthquakes in 1940 and 1977 that caused further damage, it was slightly repaired and the walls and its towers still stand today. Since 2009, the site has been administered by the Argeș County Museum.

Replica
A smaller replica of Poenari Castle was built in 1906 in Bucharest in Carol Park. Originally built for the Romanian General Exhibition it is one of the few remaining of the many monuments and constructions that used to be in the park. The construction serves currently as home to the National Office For The Cult of Heroes and it is only open for public twice in a year - on the Heroes’ Day, which in Romania is the same with the Ascension Day, and on the Romanian Army National Day (Oct 25th).

In popular culture

A modern rendering of Poenari Castle was featured in the 2013 BBC Worldwide/Starz television series Da Vinci's Demons in the episode titled "The Devil" in which Leonardo da Vinci travels to Poenari Castle in Wallachia to meet with Vlad III.

The episode "The Hardy Boys & Nancy Drew Meet Dracula" of The Hardy Boys/Nancy Drew Mysteries show in the '70s takes place inside "Dracula's Castle" in "Poenari". Shots of the castle used in the episode are of Poenari Castle, though the episode shows people driving up to the castle gates for a rock festival, which is not possible.

In Dan Simmons 1992 novel "Children of the Night", Poenari Castle is depicted towards the end of the novel as a ritual site to a cult known as" The Family" which consists of the genetically mutated descendants of Vlad the Impaler. While the novel is pure fiction, the description and depiction of the castle and surrounding region contain mostly accurate geographical and historic information.

In Fallout 3 video game, a vampire-related side quest starts in a fictional, postapocalyptic settlement, constructed on a preserved fragment of a highway in the Washington D.C. area, bearing some visual resemblance to Poenari Castle (e.g. linear structure) and named Arefu (as a hidden reference to the real-life location  from Poenari), although the toponym is disguised to look incidental (the roadsign says CAREFUL with C and L faded away).

In the 2020 documentary "Romania: Seeking Dracula’s Castle", the presenters declare that Poenari deserves the title ‘Dracula’s Castle’ as it has the ‘heart’ of Vlad III.

Legends
Numerous legends and stories about Poenari Castle have survived over the centuries. During the Communist era in Romania, foreign visitors sometimes spent the night inside the ruined structure; among them was Fatimeh Pahlavi's husband, Vincent Lee Hillyer, who claimed that in the night the temperature was much lower than usual in the castle (even in the month of July), smelled rotten flowers although there were none, he suffered from bizarre nightmares, inexplicably contracted keratosis, and got the "overpowering feeling" that he was being watched and got bitten without being physically assaulted. It was also featured as a haunted location in Ghost Hunters International in Season 1 (2008–09), episode # 14.

Gallery

See also 
 List of castles in Romania
 Tourism in Romania
 Villages with fortified churches in Transylvania

References

External links 

 Photos from the castle and visitors' information
 Some pictures from the Castle
 Speculative drawings of what the castle could have looked like by illustrator Salgood Sam.

Castles in Romania
Dracula
Historic monuments in Argeș County
Ruined castles in Romania
Tourist attractions in Argeș County